Galena is a ghost town in Lander County, Nevada approximately eleven miles southwest of Battle Mountain.

History
Galena was founded in 1869 as a mining community. The community was named for deposits of galena ore near the original town site. The Galena post office was discontinued in 1907.

References

Ghost towns in Lander County, Nevada